Miloš Džugurdić (born 2 December 1992) is a Serbian football forward who plays for Jagodina.

References

External links
 
 Miloš Džugurdić Stats at utakmica.rs

1992 births
Living people
Sportspeople from Kruševac
Association football forwards
Serbian footballers
Serbian expatriate footballers
FK Teleoptik players
FK Spartak Subotica players
FK Voždovac players
FK BSK Borča players
FK Mladost Lučani players
FK Olimpik players
FK Borac Čačak players
OFK Grbalj players
RFK Grafičar Beograd players
Serbian First League players
Serbian SuperLiga players
Premier League of Bosnia and Herzegovina players
Macedonian First Football League players
Montenegrin First League players
Serbian expatriate sportspeople in Bosnia and Herzegovina
Serbian expatriate sportspeople in North Macedonia
Serbian expatriate sportspeople in Montenegro
Expatriate footballers in Bosnia and Herzegovina
Expatriate footballers in North Macedonia
Expatriate footballers in Montenegro